

Most Successful Teams

Successful Teams

Top-Performing Clubs

Jordan League

FA Cup

FA Shield

Super Cup

Records